Eugene Williams may refer to:

 Eugene Williams Sr. (born 1941), educator and motivational speaker
 Eugene Williams (baseball) (1932–2008)
 Eugene Williams (jazz critic) (1918–1948)
 Eugene Williams (born 1918), one of the nine teenage African-American Scottsboro Boys falsely convicted of raping two white women in 1931 and sentenced to death (later exonerated)
 Eugene Williams (1902–1919), a 17-year-old African American killed after unintentionally swimming in a segregated area, which triggered the Chicago race riot of 1919
 Eugene Williams III (born 1960), pro football player, Seattle Seahawks 1982–1984 (drafted in 1982)

See also 
 Gene Williams (disambiguation)